Alejandra Laura Gulla (born July 4, 1977 in Lincoln, Buenos Aires) is a retired field hockey player from Argentina, who won the bronze medal with the national field hockey team at the 2004 Summer Olympics in Athens and at the 2008 Summer Olympics in Beijing. Gulla also won the 2010 World Cup, four Champions Trophies, and three Pan American Games. Gulla played club hockey for Lomas Athletic Club in Buenos Aires.

References 
The Official Website of the Beijing 2008 Olympic Games
 Confederación Argentina de Hockey Official site of the Argentine Hockey Confederation

External links
 

1977 births
Argentine female field hockey players
Living people
Olympic field hockey players of Argentina
Field hockey players at the 2004 Summer Olympics
Field hockey players at the 2007 Pan American Games
Field hockey players at the 2008 Summer Olympics
Olympic bronze medalists for Argentina
Las Leonas players
Olympic medalists in field hockey
Medalists at the 2008 Summer Olympics
Medalists at the 2004 Summer Olympics
Pan American Games gold medalists for Argentina
Pan American Games medalists in field hockey
Medalists at the 2007 Pan American Games
Medalists at the 1999 Pan American Games
Medalists at the 2003 Pan American Games
People from Lincoln Partido
g
Sportspeople from Buenos Aires Province
21st-century Argentine women